The russet-winged spadebill (Platyrinchus leucoryphus) is a species of bird in the family Tyrannidae.
It is found in Argentina, Brazil, and Paraguay. Its natural habitat is subtropical or tropical moist lowland forest. It is threatened by habitat loss.

References

External links
BirdLife Species Factsheet.

russet-winged spadebill
Birds of the Atlantic Forest
russet-winged spadebill
Taxonomy articles created by Polbot